Zaouiet Kontoch is a city in the Tunisian Sahel located in the immediate vicinity of Jemmal at 35 ° 38 'North, 10 ° 46 'e.

Attached to the Monastir Governorate, it is a municipality with 6 713 inhabitants at the 2014 census, whereas there were 6 713 inhabitants in 2014. 
It would be so named because of the historical presence of a small zaouia of a Muslim holy man.  On the sporting level, the city is home to the Zaouiet Kontoch Sports Association, which specializes in table tennis. 
The Mayor is Chaker Kacem.

References

External links

Ancient Berber cities
Catholic titular sees in Africa
Former Roman Catholic dioceses in Africa
Roman towns and cities in Tunisia
Carthage
Populated places in Monastir Governorate